Diary of a City Priest is a 2000 American drama film written and directed by Eugene Martin and starring David Morse.  It is based on the book of the same name by John McNamee.

Cast
David Morse as Father John McNamee
John Ryan as Father Dave Hagan
Philip Goodwin as St. Francis of Assisi
Ana Reeder as St. Therese
Robert Sella as St. Malachy
Judy Bauerlin as Sister Mary 
Marylouise Burke as Sister Grace

References

External links
 
 

American drama films
Films based on American novels
2000s English-language films
2000s American films